Maurice Herman Nipp (born March 21, 1930) is a former American football guard who played three seasons with the Philadelphia Eagles of the National Football League. He was drafted by the Philadelphia Eagles in the ninth round of the 1952 NFL Draft. He played college football at Loyola Marymount University and attended Excelsior High School in Norwalk, California.

References

External links
Just Sports Stats

Living people
1930 births
Players of American football from South Dakota
American football guards
Loyola Lions football players
Philadelphia Eagles players
People from Yankton, South Dakota